The Ballarat International Foto Biennale Inc (BIFB) is a not-for-profit organisation. Held every two years, the Ballarat International Foto Biennale is a 60-day festival in Ballarat in regional Victoria, Australia. that delivers a program of two major photographic exhibition streams: a curated Core Program showcasing significant domestic and international artists and an Open Program that fosters the development of new artists. It is a member of the Asia Pacific Photoforums.

History 
Jeff Moorfoot OAM was the first director of a photography festival that started in Daylesford in 2007 which in 2009 moved to the Central Victorian regional city of Ballarat, where it has remained.

The current Artistic Director and CEO, appointed in 2016 is Fiona Sweet, founder of a Melbourne design agency and previously board member for Melbourne Fringe and Chamber Made Opera.

In 2018 Sweet envisioned a centre for photographic excellence in Ballarat; she secured funding and is now also the Director at the National Centre for Photography, Australia’s newest and only regional gallery dedicated exclusively to photography.

COVID-19 impact 
In 2021, opening of the Biennale was delayed by regional Victoria being in a COVID-19 lockdown. It was originally due to open on 28 August and run until October. After the regional lockdown was lifted on 10 September, the Biennale was then set to open on 15 September. However, Ballarat was put into a local snap lockdown, its eighth lockdown, from 11:59 pm that same day for at least seven days. This was because the town had four recent COVID cases as well as "widespread" wastewater detections, and multiple exposure sites.

Organisation 
BIFB comprises two major exhibition programs including the Core Program, curated biennale exhibition of 20 leading Australian and international photographic artists, presented in eight heritage buildings in Ballarat. The Core Program is complemented by an open entry Fringe Program, a city‐wide presentation of over 200 artists staged in more than 80 venues including cafes and galleries, throughout project spaces, and across public sites.

These exhibitions are complemented by an Events Program that encourages an egalitarian interface with participation of the public and of photographic practitioners of all levels through its program of workshops, seminars, audio‐visual projections, master‐classes, artist floor‐talks, portfolio reviews, an education program and photographic competitions and prizes.

In 2021, under the auspice of Photo2021 the 9th Ballarat International Foto Biennale scheduled a Linda McCartney retrospective.

Impact 
In 2017, Sweet's inaugural year as creative director, the Biennale drew an audience of over 26,800, contributing an economic benefit of $3.89 million to the local economy with American photographer and video director David LaChapelle as the headline artist. In 2019 the Biennale drew more than 37,000 visitors, injecting $7.8 million into the city’s economy. Sweet successfully brought in Chinese 'concealment' artist Liu Bolin as the headliner, exhibiting his Camouflage series – highlighting critical works from the past 15 years of Bolin’s work.

References

External links 
 

Tourist attractions in Ballarat
Festivals in Victoria (Australia)
Culture of Ballarat
Photography festivals
Art biennials